Center Township is one of the eighteen townships of Monroe County, Ohio, United States. As of the 2010 census, the population was 3,647, including 2,384 living in the village of Woodsfield.

Geography
Located in the center of the county, it borders the following townships:
Sunsbury Township - northeast
Adams Township - east
Green Township - southeast
Perry Township - south
Wayne Township - southwest
Summit Township - west
Malaga Township - northwest

The village of Woodsfield, the county seat of Monroe County, is located in northern Center Township.

Name and history
It is one of nine Center Townships statewide.

Government
The township is governed by a three-member board of trustees, who are elected in November of odd-numbered years to a four-year term beginning on the following January 1. Two are elected in the year after the presidential election and one is elected in the year before it. There is also an elected township fiscal officer, who serves a four-year term beginning on April 1 of the year after the election, which is held in November of the year before the presidential election. Vacancies in the fiscal officership or on the board of trustees are filled by the remaining trustees.

References

External links
County website

Townships in Monroe County, Ohio
Townships in Ohio